Matheus Silva Ferreira da Costa (born 14 January 1987) is a Brazilian football coach, currently in charge of Santo André.

Career
Born in Curitiba, Costa played futsal at Paraná but retired at early age. He subsequently worked at Atlético Paranaense, Coritiba and Internacional before joining Levir Culpi's staff at Fluminense in 2016.

On 7 January 2017, Costa was named Wagner Lopes' assistant at Paraná. In July, after Lopes and Cristian de Souza were both sacked, he acted as an interim during a 4–1 Série B home routing of Brasil de Pelotas; after the arrival of Lisca, he returned to his previous role.

On 2 September 2017, Lisca was sacked after altercations with the club's board and supposedly assaulting Costa; he was later named interim manager. Late in the month, he was named permanent manager until the end of the year, and achieved promotion to the Série A.

Costa still left the club after his contract expired, and was appointed manager of Joinville on 13 March 2018; exactly two months later, he was sacked. On 13 August, he was named Tcheco's assistant at Coritiba.

In 2019, Costa also acted as interim at Coxa on two occasions, both after the dismissal of Argel Fucks. On 3 April of that year, he returned to Paraná, replacing sacked Dado Cavalcanti. He left the club at the end of the year, and took over Confiança on 16 February.

Costa was sacked by Dragão on 16 September 2020, being subsequently replaced by Daniel Paulista, and took over Paysandu in the Série C two days later. On 21 October, he replaced longtime incumbent Gerson Gusmão at the helm of Operário Ferroviário in the second division.

Costa was sacked by Operário on 29 September 2021, and spent a period in charge of Barra-SC before returning to the club on 26 July 2022. On 24 October, after the club's relegation, he left. 

On 22 February 2023, Costa took over Santo André.

Honours

Manager
Confiança 
 Campeonato Sergipano: 2020

References

External links

1987 births
Living people
Sportspeople from Curitiba
Brazilian football managers
Campeonato Brasileiro Série B managers
Campeonato Brasileiro Série C managers
Paraná Clube managers
Joinville Esporte Clube managers
Coritiba Foot Ball Club managers
Associação Desportiva Confiança managers
Paysandu Sport Club managers
Operário Ferroviário Esporte Clube managers
Esporte Clube Santo André managers